I Think We're Gonna Need a Bigger Boat is the debut album of British electronic act The Brighton Port Authority. It was released on Southern Fried on 6 January 2009 exclusively on amazon.com, with a regular release on 3 February.

The Brighton Port Authority is a project of British musician Norman Cook, better known as Fatboy Slim, and his longtime engineer, Simon Thornton. The album features collaborations with DJ Danger Mouse, Tom Gandey (aka Cagedbaby), Justin Robertson, Ashley Beedle, Lateef, Martha Wainwright, Jamie T, David Byrne, Dizzee Rascal, Iggy Pop, Olly Hite, Connan Mockasin, Pete York, Jack Peñate and Emmy the Great.

The album's title refers to a famous line from the 1975 Steven Spielberg movie Jaws.

The track "Should I Stay or Should I Blow" from the album, featuring Ashley Beedle, is featured in the soundtrack of FIFA 10, a video game by EA Sports.

Track listing
Collaborators for each track are listed after the length.
 "He's Frank (Slight Return)" – 3:16 (Iggy Pop)
Cover of a song by The Monochrome Set
 "Dirty Sheets" – 3:23 (Pete York)
 "Jumps the Fence" – 3:33 (Connan Mockasin)
 "Should I Stay or Should I Blow" – 2:29 (Ashley Beedle)
 "Island" – 4:26 (Justin Robertson)
 "Local Town" – 3:08 (Jamie T)
 "Seattle" – 3:55 (Emmy the Great)
 "Spade" – 3:15 (Martha Wainwright)
 "Superman" – 3:43 (Simon Thornton)
 "Superlover" – 4:11 (Cagedbaby)
 "Toe Jam" – 3:22 (David Byrne and Dizzee Rascal)
 "So It Goes" – 3:37 (Olly Hite)
Cover of a song by Nick Lowe

Japanese Version of the album also contains two bonus tracks:
"Electric Love" – 4:21
 "So Fukt" – 3:28 (Lateef)

References

External links
 

2009 debut albums
The Brighton Port Authority albums
Southern Fried Records albums